Antonio Boroni (Rome, 1738 - Rome, 21 December 1792) was an Italian composer.

Operas 
Demofoonte (dramma per musica, libretto di Pietro Metastasio, 1761, Senigallia)
La moda (dramma giocoso, libretto di Pietro Cipretti, 1761, Torino)
L'amore in musica (dramma giocoso, libretto di Carlo Goldoni da una commedia di F. Griselini, 1763, Venezia) - revisione del materiale a cura di Ciro Roberto Passilongo
La pupilla rapita (dramma giocoso, 1763, Venezia)
Sofonisba (dramma per musica, libretto di Mattia Verazi, 1764, Venezia)
Siroe, re di Persia (dramma per musica, libretto di Pietro Metastasio, 1764, Venezia)
Le villeggiatrice ridicole (dramma comico, libretto di A. G. Bianchi, 1765, Venezia)
La notte critica (dramma giocoso, libretto di Carlo Goldoni, 1766, Venezia)
Artaserse (dramma per musica, libretto di Pietro Metastasio, 1767, Praga)
Didone (dramma per musica, libretto di Pietro Metastasio, 1768, Praga)
Il carnevale (dramma giocoso, libretto di Pietro Chiari, 1769, Dresden)
Le orfane svizzere (dramma giocoso, libretto di Pietro Chiari, 1770, Venezia)
Le contadine furlane (dramma giocoso, libretto di Pietro Chiari, 1771, Venezia)
La gara de' numi nel tempio d'Apollo (1772, Stoccarda)
L'amour fraternel (opéra comiques, 1774-1775, Stoccarda)
Le déserteur (opéra comiques, 1774-1775, Stoccarda)
Zémire et Azor (opéra comiques, 1774-1775, Stoccarda)L'isola disabitata (intermezzo, libretto di Pietro Metastasio, 1775, Stoccarda)L'orfana perseguita (dramma giocoso, libretto di Pietro Chiari, 1777, Vienna)Enea nel Lazio'' (dramma per musica, libretto di Vittorio Amedeo Cigna-Santi, 1778, Roma)

References

1738 births
1792 deaths
18th-century Italian composers
People educated at the Karlsschule Stuttgart